The Civil War Monument, also known as the Civil War Memorial and Lincoln-Soldier Monument, is installed in Cambridge Common, in Cambridge, Massachusetts, United States.

The monument was completed in 1870 and was designed by artists Cyrus Cobb and Darius Cobb with supervising architect Thomas W. Silloway. McDonald & Mann were the contractors.

The memorial features a bronze statue of Abraham Lincoln.

See also
 List of sculptures of presidents of the United States
 List of statues of Abraham Lincoln

References

External links

 Cambridge Civil War Monument on "Massachusetts Civil War Monuments Project"
 
 Civil War Memorial – Cambridge Common, Cambridge, MA at Waymarking

Bronze sculptures in Massachusetts
Monuments and memorials in Massachusetts
Outdoor sculptures in Cambridge, Massachusetts
Sculptures of men in Massachusetts
Statues in Massachusetts
Statues of Abraham Lincoln